Narathiwat Provincial Administrative Organization Stadium is a multi-purpose stadium in Narathiwat Province, Thailand. It is currently used mostly for football matches and is the home stadium of Nara United F.C. The stadium holds 7,000 people.

Football venues in Thailand
Multi-purpose stadiums in Thailand
Buildings and structures in Narathiwat province
Sport in Narathiwat province